The Battle of Soor (30 September 1745) was a battle between Frederick the Great's Prussian army and an Austro-Saxon army led by Prince Charles Alexander of Lorraine during the Second Silesian War (part of the War of the Austrian Succession). The battle occurred in the vicinity of Soor, also known as Hajnice, in the modern day Czech Republic. The battle started with a failed Austrian surprise attack on the outnumbered Prussians. Despite initial setbacks the Prussian army managed to defeat the Austrians, due to an unexpected attack from a reserve regiment that refused to follow Frederick's orders.

Background
Three months after the battle of Hohenfriedberg, Frederick laid the "Camp of Staudenz", initially planning to return to Berlin, in order to inspect the building work on his new palace of Sans Souci. Having stripped off many detachments during his march through Bohemia, Frederick's numbers had been reduced to 22,500 men. Prince Charles then discovered that Frederick had failed to occupy the Graner-Koppe, a hill north of Burkersdorf (Střítež, Trutnov District, modern day Czech Republic) that dominated the landscape to the east and south. On 29 September, Charles attempted to flank the Prussian camp from the Königreich-Wald hills, and the following morning the Austrians took positions on the crucial Graner-Koppe hill. The 40,200-strong Austrian army intended to destroy the Prussians in a surprise attack.

Battle
Prussian scouts soon detected the Austrian presence, and drummers and trumpeters sounded the general alarm as Prussians began preparing for battle.  Austrian artillery proceeded to fire on the Prussian encampment, while the Prussian army marched into battle.

Frederick ordered the cavalry to charge up the valley to the side of the hill in order to encircle the enemy. During the maneuver the cavalry came under artillery fire, suffering heavy casualties. Despite the initial setback the vanguard regiments of the Gens D’Armes and General Buddenbrock's cuirassiers managed to surprise the Austrian cavalry forcing it to flee. Coming under musket fire the Prussian cavalry withdrew to the rear of the force.

By the time of the cavalry retreat, Prussian grenadiers and the Anhalt infantry regiment began engaging the Austrian troops positioned on the hill. An Austrian counterattack, supported by artillery fire, dealt significant damage to the Prussian infantry causing it to fall back.  The Prussians then launched a second assault consisting of Geist Grenadiers, Blanckensee, La Motte and other battle hardened regiments. The unwillingness of the Austrian artillery to risk firing at its own troops contributed to the fall of the summit.

A number of Prussian regiments positioned south of Burkersdorf ignored orders to remain in the area and attempted to capture Burkersdorf. A bayonet charge led by Prince Ferdinand of Brunswick seized an Austrian battery, and the surprise attack led to the collapse of the Austrian line. Despite the lack of an organised pursuit many Austrian infantrymen were captured by the Prussian cavalry regiments.

A total of 856 Prussians were killed, while the injured or missing amounted to 3,055. Austrian and Saxon troops suffered 7,444 dead, injured or missing.

Order of battle

Austrian – Saxon army order of battle

Right Wing Cavalry Division:
Kohary Dragoon Regiment
Palffy Cuirassier Regiment
Bretlach Cuirassier Regiment
Liechtenstein Dragoon Regiment
Hohenembs Cuirassier Regiment
St. Ignon Cuirassier Regiment
Right Wing Infantry Division:
Hesse – Kassel Infantry Regiment
Damnitz Infantry Regiment
Baden – Baden Infantry Regiment
Kolowrat Infantry Regiment
J. Harrach Infantry Regiment
Niepperg Infantry Regiment
Waldeck Infantry Regiment
L.Daun Infantry Regiment
Grunne Infantry Regiment
Platz Infantry Regiment
Landlau Infantry Regiment
Croatian Battalion
Center Infantry Division:
Marschal von Biberstein Infantry Regiment
Braunschweig – Wolfenbu"ttel Infantry Regiment
Bayreuth Infantry Regiment
Kokomesde de Vettes Infantry Regiment
Botta de Adorna Infantry Regiment
3 Imperial Infantry Regiments
S. Guylay Infantry Regiment
U.Browne Infantry Regiment
Left Infantry Division:
Kaiser Infantry Regiment
Karl von Lothringen Infantry Regiment
Livingstein Infantry Regiment
Wurmbrand Infantry Regiment
J. Harrach Infantry Regiment
3 Grenadier Battalions
Converged Elite Company Regiment
Left Wing Cavalry Division:
Bernes Cuirassier Regiment
Serbelloni Cuirassier Regiment

Prussian army order of battle 
Left Wing Cavalry Division:
Alt-Wurttemberg Dragoon Regiment
Gessler Cuirassier Regiment
Rochow Cuirassier Regiment
Bornstedt Cuirassier Regiment
Left Wing Infantry Division:
Grumbkow Grenadier Battalion (7/23)
Stangen Grenadier Battalion (34/Garrison #5)
Retzow Grenadier Garde Battalion
I/Leibgarde Infantry Regiment
Markgraf Karl Infantry Regiment
Dohna Infantry Regiment
Lehwaldt Infantry Regiment
Kalckstein Infantry Regiment
Right Wing Infantry Division:
Anhalt Infantry Regiment
Finck Grenadier Battalion (43/Garrison #2)
Tresckow Grenadier Battalion (35/39)
Wedel Grenadier Battalion (15/18)
Hagen Infantry Regiment
Blanckensee Infantry Regiment
La Motte Infantry Regiment
Right Wing Cavalry Division
Buddenbrock Cuirassier Regiment
Gendarmes Regiment
Kyau Cuirassier Regiment
Prinz von Preussen Cuirassier Regiment
Rothenberg Dragoon Regiment
Garde du Corps

Notes

References
 Asprey, Robert B.: "Frederick the Great: The Magnificent Enigma" Ticknor & Fields (1986). pp 333–338 
 Chandler, David: The Art of Warfare in the Age of Marlborough. Spellmount Limited, (1990). 
 Duffy, Christopher: "The Army of Frederick the Great" The Emperor's Press (1996) pp 243–245. 
 Duffy, Christopher: "Frederick the Great, A Military Life"  Routledge (1985) pp 69–71 

Soor
Soor 1745
Soor 1745
Soor 1745
Soor 1745
1745 in the Holy Roman Empire
1745 in the Habsburg monarchy
18th century in Bohemia
Soor 1745
Soor 1745
Soor 1745
History of the Hradec Králové Region